This Is Eggland is the fifth studio album by English punk rock band The Lovely Eggs. It was released in February 2018 under Egg Records.

Critical reception
This Is Eggland was met with "generally favourable" reviews from critics. At Metacritic, which assigns a weighted average rating out of 100 to reviews from mainstream publications, this release received an average score of 72, based on 12 reviews.

Accolades

Track listing

Charts

References

2018 albums
The Lovely Eggs albums